"Hwanghae Province" or "Hwanghae-do" is, according to South Korean law, a province of the Republic of Korea, as the South Korean government formally claims to be the legitimate government of whole of Korea. The area constituting the province is under the de facto jurisdiction of North Korea.

As South Korea does not recognize changes in administrative divisions made by North Korea, official maps of the South Korean government shows Hwanghae Province in its pre-1945 borders. The area corresponds to North Korea's North Hwanghae Province (except Kaesong which is claimed to be part of Gyeonggi Province) and South Hwanghae Province.

To symbolize its claims, the South Korean government established the Committee for the Five Northern Korean Provinces as an administrative body for the five northern provinces. A governor for Hwanghae Province is appointed by the President of South Korea.

Administrative divisions 
Hwanghae-do is divided into 3 cities (si) and 17 counties (gun).

City 
 Haeju
 21 dong
 Sariwon
 12 dong
 Songnim
 28 dong

County 
 Byeokseong (administrative center at Haeju)
 20 myeon : Gajwa, Geomdan, Gosan, Nadeok, Daegeo, Donggang, Miyul, Seoseok, Songrim, Unsan, Wolrok, Janggok, Haenam, Geumsan, Naesong, Dongun, Yeongcheon, Ilsin, Cheongryong, Chuhwa
 Yeonbaek
 1 eup : Yeonan
 19 myeon : Gwaegung, Geumsan, Dochon, Mokdan, Bongbuk, Bongseo, Seoksan, Songbong, Onjeong, Yongdo, Unsan, Yugok, Euncheon, Haeryong, Haeseong, Haewol, Honam, Hodong, Hwaseong
 Ongjin
 1 eup : Ongjin
 10 myeon : Gacheon, Gyojeong, Dongnam, Bonggu, Bumin, Buk, Seo, Yongyeon, Yongcheon, Heungmi
 Jangyeon
 1 eup : Jangyeon
 9 myeon : Nakdo, Daegu, Mokgam, Sokdal, Suntaek, Sinhwa, Yongyeon, Haean, Hunam
 Geumcheon
 12 Myeon : Geumcheon, Godong, Gui, Sanoe, Seobuk, Seocheon, Oeryu, Ubong, Ungdeok, Jwa, Tosan, Habtan
 Singye
 8 myeon : Singye, Go, Dami, Dayul, Maseo, Saji, Jeokyeo, Chon
 Pyeongsan
 1 eup : Namcheon
 13 myeon : Pyongsan, Goji, Geumam, Masan, Munmu, Sangwol, Seobong, Segok, Sinam, Anseong, Yongsan, Insan, Jeokam
 Bongsan (administrative center at Sariwon)
 13 myeon : Guyeon, Gicheon, Deokjae, Dongseon, Mancheon, Munjeong, Sain, Sansu, Seojeong, Ssangsan, Yeongcheon, Chowa, Toseong 
 Seoheung
 1 eup : Sinmak
 10 myeon : Seoheung, Gupo, Naedeok, Do, Maeyang, Mokgam, Sepyeong, Sosa, Yongpyeong, Yulri
 Jaeryeong
 1 eup : Jaeryeong
 10 myeon : Namryul, Bukryul, Samgang, Sangseong, Seoho, Sinwon, Eunryong, Jangsu, Cheongcheon, Haseong
 Sincheon
 1 eup : Sincheon
 14 myeon : Garyeon, Gasan, Gungheung, Nambu, Nowol, Dura, Munmu, Munhwa, Bukbu, Sancheon, Oncheon, Yongmun, Yongjin, Chori
 Songhwa
 13 myeon : Songhwa, Punghae, Dowon, Bongrae, Sangri, Yeonbang, Yeonjeong, Unyu, Yulri, Jangyang, Jinpung, Cheondong
 Eunyul
 7 myeon : Eunyul, Nambu, Bukbu, Seobu, Ildo, Ido, Jangryeon
 Anak
 1 eup : Anak
 8 myeon : Daewon, Daehaeng, Munsan, Seoha, Angok, Yongmun, Yongsun, Eunhong
 Hwangju
 1 eup : Hwangju
 11 myeon : Gurak, Guseong, Dochi, Samjeon, Yeongpung, Ingyo, Junam, Cheonju, Cheongryong, Cheongsu, Heukgyo
 Suan
 9 myeon : Suan, Gongpo, Daeseong, Daeo, Doso, Sugu, Yeonam, Yulgye, Cheongok
 Goksan
 12 myeon : Goksan, Dohwa, Dongchon, Myeokmi, Bongmyeong, Sangdo, Seochon, Unjung, Iryeong, Cheonggye, Hado, Hwachon

See also 
 The Committee for the Five Northern Korean Provinces
 North Hwanghae Province of the Democratic People's Republic of Korea (North Korea)
 South Hwanghae Province of the Democratic People's Republic of Korea (North Korea)
 Hwanghae, historical Eight Provinces of Korea

External link
Hwanghae province residents central council

Provinces of South Korea
States and territories established in 1949